Circuit de Nevers Magny-Cours is a  motor racing circuit located in central France, near the towns of Magny-Cours and Nevers, some  from Paris and  from Lyon.

It staged the Formula One French Grand Prix from 1991 (succeeding Circuit Paul Ricard) to 2008, and the 24-hour Bol d'Or motorcycle endurance events from 2000 to 2014 (succeeded by Circuit Paul Ricard). It hosted the French motorcycle Grand Prix in 1992, and the Superbike World Championship in 1991 and annually since 2003.

Magny-Cours has hosted several additional international championships, like the World Sportscar Championship, World Touring Car Championship, FIA GT Championship, World Series by Renault and Formula 3 Euroseries. Also, the FFSA GT Championship has visited the circuit since 1997.

A campus of the French engineering college Institut supérieur de l'automobile et des transports is also located on the circuit, as well as the museum Conservatoire de la monoplace française.

History

Commonly dubbed Magny-Cours, it was built in 1960 by Jean Bernigaud and was home to the prestigious Winfield racing school (École de Pilotage Winfield), which produced drivers such as François Cevert, Jacques Laffite and Didier Pironi. The circuit was opened in 7 August 1960. However, in the 1980s the track fell into disrepair and was not used for international motor racing until it was purchased by the Conseil Départemental de la Nièvre in 1986.

In the 1990s, the Ligier Formula One team and its successor Prost were based at the circuit and did much of their testing at Magny-Cours.

The circuit hosted the French Formula One Grand Prix from 1991 until 2008, and the Bol d'Or from 2000 until 2014.

The circuit was re-designed in 2003 and used for a wide range of events include various sports and commercial use. For the 2003 French Grand Prix, the final corner and chicane were changed in an effort to increase overtaking, with little effect.

Michael Schumacher was able to win the 2004 French Grand Prix using an unprecedented four-stop strategy.

In 2006, Michael Schumacher became the first driver ever to win any single Formula One Grand Prix a total of 8 times and at the same circuit.

Bernie Ecclestone originally confirmed that F1 would not return to Magny-Cours in 2008, instead moving to an alternative location possibly in Paris. However in a striking U-turn, it was revealed that the 2008 French Grand Prix would take place at Magny-Cours with the release of the official calendar in July 2007.

In May 2008, Ecclestone confirmed that Magny-Cours would stop hosting the French Grand Prix after the 2008 race, suggesting that he was looking into the possibility of hosting the French Grand Prix on the streets of Paris. The venue suffered from poor attendances due to its remote location, poor access and insufficient accommodation.

In June 2008, the provisional calendar for the 2009 season was released, and a French Grand Prix at Magny-Cours appeared on it, scheduled for 28 June. However, in October 2008 the 2009 French Grand Prix was cancelled after the French Motorsports Federation (FFSA) withdrew financing for the event. In 2009 the track hosted its first Superleague Formula event. It also hosted a second event in 2010.

The circuit was used as part of stage three of the 2014 Paris–Nice cycling race, with the peloton completing almost a full lap of the circuit – in the reverse direction to its motorsport use – before the finish on the front straight.

The circuit

The track nowadays is a smooth circuit with good facilities for the teams, although restricted access prevents spectators from reaching many parts of the circuit. Unusually, many corners are modelled on famous turns from other circuits, and are named after those circuits, i.e.. the fast Estoril corner (turn 3), the Adelaide hairpin (turn 5) and the Nürburgring and Imola chicanes (turns 7 and 12 respectively). It has a mix of slow hairpins and high-speed chicane sections which includes a long fast straight into the first-gear Adelaide hairpin, the best overtaking opportunity on the circuit. The circuit is very flat with negligible change in elevation (only a small valley at the Estoril corner and a slight hill near the Lycee corner).

The circuit provides few overtaking opportunities, despite modifications in 2003, which means the races here are commonly regarded as quite uneventful. Formula 1 races at Magny-Cours tend to have a processional nature, with most overtaking occurring during pit stop sequences.

More varied racing occurs when it rains, such as in the 1999 race, which was interrupted by a downpour. After a restart, most top contenders developed problems, which paved the way for Heinz-Harald Frentzen to claim a surprising victory in his Jordan.

Although the Bol d'Or 24-hour motorcycle endurance race was held at Magny-Cours for several years, it returned to the more popular Circuit Paul Ricard in 2015, which held the mentioned race before Magny-Cours.

Events

 Current
 May: Alpine Elf Europa Cup, FFSA GT Championship, French F4 Championship, Porsche Carrera Cup France, Grand Prix de France de Superkart
 June: Fun Cup
 September: Superbike World Championship
 October: BOSS GP Historic Tour Magny-Cours, Ultimate Cup 4 Hours of Magny-Cours

 Former
 Auto GP (2003, 2007, 2009–2010)
 European Touring Car Championship (2001–2004)
 European Touring Car Cup (2016)
 FIA European Formula 3 Championship (1978–1984)
 FIA GT Championship (2000–2005)
 FIA Sportscar Championship (1999–2002)
 FIM Endurance World Championship Bol d'Or (2000–2014)
 Formula 3 Euro Series (2003–2004, 2007)
 Formula 750 (1975)
 Formula One French Grand Prix (1991–2008)
 Formula Renault Eurocup (2004, 2007, 2010, 2020)
 French Formula Renault Championship (1971–1973, 1975–1987, 1989–2009)
 French Formula Three Championship (1964–1973, 1978–1987, 1989–2002)
 French Supertouring Championship (1976–1987, 1989–1990, 1992–1994, 1997–2005)
 GP2 Series (2005–2008)
 Grand Prix motorcycle racing French motorcycle Grand Prix (1992)
 GT World Challenge Europe (2020–2022)
 International Formula 3000 (1992–1996, 1999–2004)
 International GT Open (2006–2011)
 International Touring Car Championship (1995–1996)
 Porsche Supercup (1993–1997, 2000, 2003–2008)
 Racecar Euro Series (2009, 2011)
 Sidecar World Championship (1992, 2003, 2010)
 Superleague Formula (2009–2010)
 World Sportscar Championship Championnat du Monde de Voitures de Sport (1991–1992)
 World Touring Car Championship FIA WTCC Race of France (2005–2006)

Lap records

The official lap record for the current Grand Prix circuit layout is 1:15.377, set by Michael Schumacher during the 2004 French Grand Prix, while the unofficial all-time track record is 1:13.698, set by Fernando Alonso in the qualifying of aforementioned race. The official fastest race lap records at the Circuit de Nevers Magny-Cours are listed as:

Weather and climate
The Nevers area has an oceanic climate that is still influenced by its far inland position. There was one notable exception, when both the qualifying and the race of 1999 saw a fully wet track. With the Grand Prix being held in the middle of summer, tyre wear through high asphalt temperatures was possible. Magny-Cours' main event post-Grand Prix era, Superbike World Championship is being held in autumn and as a result sees colder temperatures.

References

External links

Google Maps satellite view of Circuit de Nevers Magny-Cours
Nevers Magny-Cours History and Statistics
Track info from official F1 site
A lap of Magny-Cours with Honda’s Alexander Wurz
Magny-Cours - the technical requirements

Superbike World Championship circuits
Magny
Magny
Magny
Magny
Sports venues in Nièvre
World Touring Car Championship circuits
Nevers